The Tazabagyab culture is from late Bronze Age, ca. 1850 BC to 1500 BC, which flourished in lower Zeravshan valley, as well as along the lower Amu Darya towards the south shore of the Aral Sea; this last region is known as Khwarazm or Khorezm. Earlier it was thought to be from ca. 1500 BC to 1100 BC and regarded a southern offshoot of the Andronovo culture, composed of Indo-Iranians, but Stanislav Grigoriev, in a recent study asserts that Tazabagyab is not part of Andronovo culture.

Origins
The Tazabagyab culture emerged in the lower Zeravshan valley and lower Amu Darya around 1850 BC, earlier thought to be a southern variant of the Andronovo culture, but now considered an independent culture. Unlike the Andronovo peoples further to the north, who were largely pastoral, the people of the Tazabagyab culture were largely agricultural. 

Mallory/Adams (1997) described that they were descended from Indo-Iranian steppe herders from the north, who would have spread southwards and established agricultural communities.

Tazabagyab culture's sites located in the Amu Darya delta formed a border zone, between Andronovo and Srubnaya steppe cultures in the north, and southern oasis cultures of Central Asia, during the Late Bronze Age. The burial site in Kokcha 3, located near Sultanuizdag mountain, around 250 km to the south of Aral Sea, is the largest cemetery excavated until now.

Characteristics

Tazabagyab settlements show evidence of small-scale irrigation agriculture. About fifty settlements have been discovered. These contained subterranean rectangular houses, usually three per village. Tazabagyav houses are generally large, some being more than 10 x 10 m in dimensions. They are built of clay and the reeds are supported by timber posts. Ca. 100 individuals, belonging to around ten families, would have inhabited a Tazabagyav village. Figurines and remains of horses have been found.

In Tazabagyav burials, males are buried on their left, while females are buried on their right. This is similar to contemporary Indo-European cultures in the region, such as the Andronovo culture, Bishkent culture, the Swat culture and the Vakhsh culture, and the earlier Corded Ware culture of central and eastern Europe. This practice has been identified as a typical Indo-Iranian tradition.

Metal objects of the Tazabagyab culture are similar to those of the Andronovo culture in Kazakhstan, and of the Srubnaya culture further west. Archaeological evidence show that Tazabagyab settlements included metal-working craftsmen.

Its ceramics were of the Namazga VI type which was common throughout Central Asia at the time. Tazabagyav pottery appears throughout a wide area.

The Tazabagyab people appears to have controlled the trade in minerals such as copper, tin and turquoise, and pastoral products such as horses, dairy and leather. This must have given them great political power in the old oasis towns of the Bactria–Margiana Archaeological Complex. Their mastery of chariot warfare must have given them military control. This probably encouraged social, political and also military integration.

Successors
David W. Anthony suggests that Tazabagyav culture might have been a predecessor of early Indo-Aryan peoples such as the compilers of the Rigveda and the Mitanni.

See also

 Suyarganovo culture
 Chust culture
 Begazy-Dandybai culture
 Yaz culture

References

Bibliography

Further reading
 

Archaeological cultures in Turkmenistan
Archaeological cultures in Uzbekistan
Bronze Age cultures of Asia
Indo-Iranian archaeological cultures